Kesselspitz is a mountain of Bavaria, Germany.

hzixkv

Mountains of Bavaria
Mountains of the Alps